Trifurcula salicinae is a moth of the family Nepticulidae. It is endemic to the Canary Islands.

The larvae feed on Globularia salicina. They mine the leaves of their host plant. The mine consists of a faint, fine, straight corridor along the midrib, that is completely filled with frass. Later the corridor widens considerably, with irregular sides and a heavy frass line that leaves a broad transparent margin at either side. The corridor regularly alternates from upper-surface to lower-surface.

External links
bladmineerders.nl
Fauna Europaea

Nepticulidae
Moths of Africa
Moths described in 1975